Patrick Zieker (born 13 December 1993) is a German handball player for TVB 1898 Stuttgart and the German national team.

He represented Germany at the 2020 European Men's Handball Championship.

References

External links

1993 births
Living people
German male handball players
Handball-Bundesliga players
People from Ludwigsburg
Sportspeople from Stuttgart (region)